SketchFighter 4000 Alpha is a scrolling shooter with a focus on exploration for Mac OS X. The game was created by Lost Minds together with Ambrosia Software. SketchFighter uses OpenGL and a custom game engine to create visuals for all elements of the game reminiscent of hand-drawn sketches.

SketchFighter is distributed as shareware; specifically, crippleware as only a subset of the game is playable prior to registration.

In 2020, SketchFighter was re-released for the Mac App Store

Gameplay
SketchFighter's gameplay consists of using the ship to explore different "zones" or areas in the game. Players must fight a variety of enemies as they explore and progress through the game. Players acquire different power-up items in the game, such as different weapon types, different colors of weapons, improved shields, and faster and stronger engines. Some of these power-ups require defeating a boss; others are offered for exploring new areas of the map, including areas that can be unlocked by the player through the use of the newly acquired power-up (one of many.)

The ship can navigate forward and backward and rotate. Strafing is not supported; the ship fires in the direction it is facing (within a random margin of error).

SketchFighter offers two-player cooperative and competitive modes, and it includes a Web-based high score board.

SketchFighter also includes a custom level generator that the player can use to create their own levels.

References

External links
Official Web Site
MacWorld News: SketchFighter game evokes grade school doodling
Inside Mac Games Preview: SketchFighter 4000 Alpha

2006 video games
MacOS games
MacOS-only games
Classic Mac OS games
Ambrosia Software games
Video games developed in Sweden